Leven Park is a housing estate in the south of Yarm, England, which is next to the Levendale estate. Leven Park has two schools Yarm Primary School and Conyers secondary school. It has a shopping park named Leven Park retail park. This contains Aldi, A newsagents, Leven park chemists and two takeaways. The Leven Park estate mainly comes off Kirk Road and has four main mini-estates Hemingford gardens, Howden Dike and St Nicholas gardens. The streets of the estate are as follows:
Canon Grove
 Hemingford gardens
Mortain Close
Kelstene close
Westworth close
Howden Dike
Carpenter Close
Miller Close
Stonehouse Close
Atwater Close
Hugil Close
Bulmer Close
Wardell Close
 Nursery Close
St Nicholas Gardens
Oughton Close
Wharton Close
Winpenny Close 
Daltry Close
Fowler Close
Caterton Close
Earle Close
Urford Close
Playlin Close

Housing estates in England
Yarm